Lithocharis ochracea is a species of rove beetle in the family Staphylinidae. It is found in Europe and North America.

References

Further reading

 

Paederinae
Articles created by Qbugbot
Beetles described in 1802